Glorious Fool is the ninth studio album by musician John Martyn.  After a long association with Island Records, this was Martyn's first of two albums for WEA.  The album was produced by Phil Collins and engineered by Nick Launay and Steve Travell.  The album is named for the title track satirizing Ronald Reagan's ascent to the White House as the 40th U.S. President.

The opening track "Couldn't Love You More" is a re-worked arrangement of the song that originally appeared on 1977's One World. The original acoustic version is here re-recorded as a full-band track, featuring a guest appearance from Eric Clapton. Clapton covered Martyn's "May You Never" on his 1977 album Slowhand. When Martyn was presented with a lifetime achievement award by Collins at the 2008 BBC Folk Awards, Clapton sent a message saying that he was "so far ahead of everything else it was inconceivable". "Couldn't Love You More", in its various forms, remained a fixture of Martyn's live performances. Irish Musician Lisa Hannigan has described the song as one of her favourites, covering the song with Faultline in 2006.

In August 1981, "Please Fall In Love With Me"/"Don't You Go" was released as a single.

More mainstream in production compared to Martyn's previous albums, and helped by promotion in the way of a 32-date UK tour, Glorious Fool charted at #25 on its release.

Track listing
All tracks composed by John Martyn.

"Couldn't Love You More"  – 3:59
"Amsterdam" – 5:27
"Hold On My Heart"  – 4:39
"Perfect Hustler"– 4:42
"Hearts and Keys"  – 7:33
"Glorious Fool" – 4:58
"Never Say Never" – 4:56
"Pascanel (Get Back Home)"  – 3:48
"Didn't Do That" – 4:20
"Please Fall in Love With Me"  – 6:07
"Don't You Go"  – 4:43

Personnel
John Martyn - vocals, guitar
Eric Clapton - guitar on "Couldn't Love You More"
Alan Thomson - bass
Max Middleton - keyboards
Dick Cuthell - flugelhorn on "Hold on My Heart", trumpet on "Didn't Do That"
Phil Collins - drums, vocoder and additional vocals, piano on "Don't You Go"
Danny Cummings - percussion
Technical
 Phil Collins - producer
Nick Launay - engineer
Steve Travell - assistant engineer
Bill Smith - cover design
Eberhard Grames - front cover photo
Andrew Douglas - back cover photo
Sandy Robertson, Paul Brown - management

References

External links
The Official John Martyn Website

John Martyn albums
1981 albums
Albums produced by Phil Collins
Warner Records albums